Aljoša Asanović (born 14 December 1965) is a former Croatian professional footballer who played as a midfielder from 1984 to 2002. He was one of the best players in the Yugoslav First League, emerging as one of five top scorers during the 1989–90 season with 14 goals. 

Asanović is best known for his great performance in the mid-to-late 1990s when he played for Derby County and for Croatia during Euro 96 as well as the 1998 FIFA World Cup. He scored the first goal in Croatia's team modern history. He was the coach for the Zambia national football team for a short period of time in 2022,before leaving over non payment of wages.

Club career

Early Days
Born in Split, SR Croatia, SFR Yugoslavia, Asanović started his professional career with Hajduk Split in 1984. In the 1989 to 1990 season, Asanović emerged as the best player of the Yugoslavia football league. This was first of the three spells he had with Hajduk, as he came back to play for the club in 1994 and 2001 respectively. In his first spell with Hajduk, he played until the 1990, when he was signed by the French club FC Metz.

French Clubs
He spent one season with FC Metz, during which he made total of 35 appearances and scored 13 goals.
In the summer of 1991, he moved to another French club, AS Cannes, where he also spent only one season.
In the beginning of the 1992/93 season he was signed by his third club in France: Montpellier HSC. He appeared in total of 43 matches and scored 10 goals in the process. He stayed with the club for two seasons, until the summer of 1994.

Hajduk Split
After four season in France, he was summoned by his native club Hajduk Split in 1994. The club signed Asanović and several other important players such as Igor Štimac, Tonči Gabrić and FC Barcelona youngster Goran Vučević, as they were eager to qualify for 1994–95 UEFA Champions League for the first time since Croatian independence. Asanović scored two goals in 2nd leg of qualifier against KP Legia Warsaw and Hajduk Split qualified for 1994–95 UEFA Champions League. Asanović added another goal in the group stage match against Steaua București. Hajduk went on to reach the quarterfinals of 1994–95 UEFA Champions League where they were eliminated by eventual champions AFC Ajax. During 1994–95 season with Hajduk, Asanović won Croatian league and Cup, appearing in 33 domestic league matches and scoring 8 goals.

In the summer of 1995, he was loaned to Spanish La Liga team Real Valladolid.

Derby County
In July 1996 Asanović was signed by Premier League club Derby County, where he played alongside his former Hajduk teammate Igor Štimac. He spent one and a half seasons with Derby County and appeared in 38 domestic league matches.

At the start of the 1997–98 season, with the 1998 FIFA World Cup looming in the summer, he was not a regular in the Derby side and decided to leave the club in December 1997 in order to find his form for the summer tournament in France.

Napoli
In winter of 1997, Asanović changed clubs again. After playing for several clubs in Croatia, France, Spain and England he moved to his 5th different professional football league. This time he moved to Italy, as he signed with S.S.C. Napoli. He established himself in the team quickly and managed to make appearance in 15 Serie A games during his 6 months spell with the club, but failed to score a single goal.

Panathinaikos
After some impressive performances at 1998 FIFA World Cup, he signed with Panathinaikos F.C. in Greece. In two seasons with Panathinaikos he appeared in 44 league matches, scoring 9 goals.

Late Career
In 2000, he moved to Austria Wien. In 2001, he moved to Australia to sign with National Soccer League side Sydney United 58 FC, a side formed and backed by Croatians in Australia. After a short spell in Australia he played in the Canadian Professional Soccer League with Toronto Croatia then he returned to his hometown club Hajduk Split and finished his career.

International career
Asanović was one of the best players for the Croatia national team during their golden age from 1994 to 1998. He was arguably Croatia's most intelligent player in midfield, yet lacked the complete package of skills possessed by his fellow midfielder Robert Prosinečki. He debuted for the national on 17 October 1990, which ended in a 2–1 victory against the United States. This was Croatia's first international game since the independence from Yugoslavia, and Asanović even scored the first goal.

Asanović participated in the Euro 1996 as well as the 1998 FIFA World Cup, in which Croatia won the bronze medal. In semi-final of the FIFA World Cup, Asanović made a spectacular assist to Davor Šuker from the centre of the field with a loop pass, for Croatia to take the lead against the host France.

His last international match was a 28 May 2000 friendly against France. In total he was capped 62 times, scoring 3 goals, thus ranking among the top five Croatian national players. Asanović ended his active career in 2002 while with Hajduk Split, the club in which his career had started almost twenty years earlier.

Management Career
In 2006, he became assistant manager of the Croatia national team. He held this role from 2006 until 2012, working alongside Slaven Bilić who was the head coach. He departed when Bilić was replaced by Igor Štimac.

After his departure from the national team, Asanović took up another assistant role, this time in Russia, following Slaven Bilić to FC Lokomotiv Moscow. Asanović departed the club at the end of the season.

In 2015, Asanović became the new technical director of DAC Dunajská Streda.

In October 2017, Asanović took up a job in Australia, becoming the head coach of National Premier Leagues Victoria side Melbourne Knights FC.

In October 2018, Asanović took up an assistant coach role with a Saudi Arabian premier league side  Al-Ittihad Jeddah up until 2019.

Asanović was the Director and Diaspora instructor for the Croatian Football Federation from 2019 to June 2021 before being appointed Technical Director for the Zambia National Football Team, a role he held till December 2021.

He was appointed Zambia’s Head Coach in January 2022.

Personal life
Asanović's son Antonio, who was born in France while Asanović was playing for Cannes, is also a footballer.

Career Statistics

International goals

Managerial statistics
As of 23 September 2022.

Note: win or lose by penalty shoot-out is counted as the draw in time.

Honours

Player
Hajduk Split
Croatian First League: 1994–95
Croatian Cup: 1995
Croatian Super Cup: 1994
Yugoslav Cup: 1987, 1991

Montpellier
Coupe de la Ligue: 1992

Individual
Franjo Bučar State Award for Sport: 1998

Manager
Zambia
2022 COSAFA Cup

Orders
 Order of Danica Hrvatska with face of Franjo Bučar: 1995
 Order of the Croatian Trefoil: 1998

References

External links

Aljoša Asanović profile at Reprezentacija.rs 

1965 births
Living people
Footballers from Split, Croatia
Association football midfielders
Yugoslav footballers
Yugoslavia international footballers
Croatian footballers
Croatia international footballers
Dual internationalists (football)
UEFA Euro 1996 players
1998 FIFA World Cup players
HNK Hajduk Split players
FC Metz players
AS Cannes players
Montpellier HSC players
Real Valladolid players
Derby County F.C. players
S.S.C. Napoli players
Panathinaikos F.C. players
FK Austria Wien players
Sydney United 58 FC players
Toronto Croatia players
Yugoslav First League players
Ligue 1 players
Croatian Football League players
La Liga players
Premier League players
Serie A players
Super League Greece players
National Soccer League (Australia) players
Canadian Soccer League (1998–present) players
Yugoslav expatriate footballers
Expatriate footballers in France
Yugoslav expatriate sportspeople in France
Croatian expatriate footballers
Croatian expatriate sportspeople in France
Expatriate footballers in Spain
Croatian expatriate sportspeople in Spain
Expatriate footballers in England
Croatian expatriate sportspeople in England
Expatriate footballers in Italy
Croatian expatriate sportspeople in Italy
Expatriate footballers in Greece
Croatian expatriate sportspeople in Greece
Expatriate footballers in Austria
Croatian expatriate sportspeople in Austria
Expatriate soccer players in Australia
Croatian expatriate sportspeople in Australia
Expatriate soccer players in Canada
Croatian expatriate sportspeople in Canada
Croatian football managers
Melbourne Knights FC managers
Zambia national football team managers
Croatian expatriate football managers
Croatian expatriate sportspeople in Russia
Croatian expatriate sportspeople in Slovakia
Expatriate soccer managers in Australia
Croatian expatriate sportspeople in Saudi Arabia
Expatriate football managers in Zambia
Franjo Bučar Award winners